The Bentley Boys were a group of wealthy British motorists who drove Bentley sports cars to victory in the 1920s and kept the marque's reputation for high performance alive. In 1925, as the marque foundered, Bentley Boy Woolf Barnato bought the company, leading to the creation of the famous supercharged Bentley Blower car.

The Bentley Boys included:
 Woolf "Babe" Barnato, heir to Kimberley diamond magnate Barney Barnato
 Dudley Benjafield
 Sir Henry "Tim" Birkin
 Dale Bourne
 Frank Clement
 S. C. H. "Sammy" Davis, automotive journalist, sports editor of The Autocar
 John Duff
 George Duller, steeplechaser
 Clive Dunfee
 Jack Dunfee
 Dudley Froy
 Baron Andre d’Erlanger, playboy
 Clive Gallop, engineer
 Glen Kidston, aviator
 Bertie Kensington Moir
 Bernard Rubin, pearl fishery magnate
 Jean Chassagne, French racing driver
 Sir Alex Moore, British racing driver
 Joe Brown, British racing driver

Thanks to the dedication of this group to serious racing, the company, located at Cricklewood, north London, was noted for its four consecutive victories at the 24 hours of Le Mans from 1927 to 1930. Their greatest competitor at the time, Bugatti, whose lightweight, elegant, but fragile creations contrasted with the Bentley's rugged reliability and durability, referred to them as "the world's fastest lorries".

In March 1930, during the Blue Train Races, Woolf Barnato raised the stakes on Rover and its Rover Light Six having raced and beaten Le Train Bleu for the first time, to better that record with his 6½ Litre Bentley Speed Six on a bet of GBP100. He drove against the train from Cannes to Calais, then by ferry to Dover and finally London, travelling on public highways, and won. The H. J. Mulliner-bodied formal saloon he drove during the race, as well as a streamlined fastback "Sportsman Coupe" by Gurney Nutting delivered to him on 21 May 1930 became known as the Blue Train Bentleys. The "Sportsman Coupe" has been erroneously referred to as being the car that raced the Blue Train, while in fact Barnato named it in memory of his race.

A great deal of Barnato's fortune went to keeping Bentley afloat after he became chairman in 1925; but the Great Depression destroyed demand for the company's expensive products, and it was finally sold off to Rolls-Royce in 1931.

See also
 British Racing Drivers' Club
 Lagonda

References

Further reading
Clarke, R. M. (1998). Le Mans: The Bentley & Alfa Years 1923–1939. Brooklands Books. 
Feast, Richard (2004). The DNA of Bentley. St. Paul, MN: MotorBooks International. 
Foulkes, Nicholas (2006). The Bentley Era: The Fast and Furious Story of the Fabulous Bentley Boys. Quadrille Publishing. 
Frankel, Andrew (2005). Bentley: The Story. Redwood Publishing. 
Moity, Christian; Jean-Marc Teissèdre, Alain Bienvenu (1992). 24 heures du Mans, 1923–1992. Besançon: Éditions d’Art. 

 
English racing drivers
Bentley
Nicknamed groups of racing drivers